Timken may refer to:

People
 Henry Timken (1831–1909), founder of the Timken Company
 Jane Timken (born 1966), politician
 William R. Timken (born 1938), U.S. ambassador to Germany

Other
 Timken, Kansas, town
 Timken 1111,  4-8-4 steam locomotive built in 1930
 Timken Company, a manufacturer of industrial parts
 Timken High School, in Canton, Ohio, United States
 Timken House, historic house in California
 Timken Museum of Art, fine art museum in San Diego, California, United States
 Timken Roller Bearing Company